North Padang Lawas (Padang Lawas Utara) is a regency in North Sumatra province of Indonesia. It has an area of 3,918.05 km2, and had a population of 223,049 at the 2010 census and 260,720 at the 2020 census. Its administrative seat is the town of Gunung Tua.

Demographics

Population 
The population of North Padang Lawas in the 2010 census results was 223,049 people with a density of 57 per square kilometer, which in 2020 increased to 260,720 people with population growth from year to year around 2.18%.

Ethnic 
The population of North Padang Lawas district is quite ethnically diverse. Overall, the majority of the population comes from the Batak Angkola tribe. Various types of Angkola Batak clans, such as: Harahap, Lubis, Siregar, Nasution, Hasibuan, Daulay, Dalimunte, Hutasuhut, Batubara. In addition, Batak Toba, Nias and Javanese are also quite numerous in North Padang Lawas.

Religion 
Followers of religion Islam amounted to 90.40%, then Protestanism 9.21%, Catholicism 0.38% and Buddhism around 0.01%. The Batak people of Angkola, Mandailing, Minangkabau and Javanese, generally embrace Islam. Meanwhile, the ethnic Batak Toba, Karo, Simalungun and Nias people, mostly embrace Christianity. Meanwhile, there are 593 mosques, 34 Protestant churches and 1 Catholic church.

Administrative Districts
At the 2010 census, the regency was divided into nine districts (kecamatan). Subsequently, three additional districts (Padang Bolak Tenggara, Ujung Batu and Halongonan Timur) have been created by the division of existing districts. The districts are tabulated below with their areas and their populations at the 2010 census and the 2020 census.

Notes:(a) The 2010 population of Padang Bolak District is included in the figure for Padang Bolak District, from which it was split.(b) The 2010 population of Ujung Batu District is included in the figure for Simangambat District, from which it was split.(c) The 2010 population of Halongonan Timur District is included in the figure for Halongonan District, from which it was split.

Archaeology

The Padang Lawas archaeological site is partly located in the regency. The site covers approximately 1,500 km2, encompassing the kecamatan (districts) of Portibi and Padang Bolak in this regency, and Barumun and Barumun Tengah in the Padang Lawas Regency. Hindu-Buddhist remains are found on the site, including structures called biaro (from Sanskrit vihara, meaning "temple" or "monastery").

The village of Batu Gana in Padang Bolak Julu district is the location of a burial site consisting of a megalithic structure.

In the village of Padang Bujur in the same district, one can also find megalithic remains and what seems to be the base for a padmasana.

Other megalithic remains are found at Aek Korsik and Aek Tolong Huta, also in the Padang Bolak district.

References

Simanjuntak, Truman, M. Hisyam, Bagyo Prasetyo, Titi Surti Nastiti (éds.), Archaeology: Indonesian perspective : R.P. Soejono's festschrift, LIPI, Jakarta, 2006, 

Regencies of North Sumatra